Omoglymmius germari is a species of beetle in the subfamily Rhysodidae. It was described by Ludwig Ganglbauer in 1891.

References

germari
Beetles described in 1891